Pinker and Prouder Than Previous is a 1988 album by British singer-songwriter Nick Lowe. It was released by Demon Records in the UK and Europe, and was his final album for Columbia Records in the US.

On 20 October 2017 Yep Roc Records reissued it on CD and LP, marking its first release on compact disc in the US.

Track listing
All songs written by Nick Lowe except as noted.
 "(You're My) Wildest Dream" – 3:19
 "Crying in My Sleep" – 3:56
 "Big Hair" – 2:13
 "Love Gets Strange" (John Hiatt) – 3:30
 "I Got the Love" – 2:43
 "Black Lincoln Continental" (Graham Parker) – 2:36
 "Cry It Out" – (Nick Lowe, Profile) 2:56
 "Lovers Jamboree" (Nick Lowe, Paul Carrack) – 3:37
 "Geisha Girl" (Lawton Williams) – 2:18
 "Wishing Well" – 3:00
 "Big Big Love" (Ray Carroll, Wynn Stewart) – 2:49

Personnel
Nick Lowe – guitar, bass, vocals 
Paul Carrack – organ, piano
John Hiatt – guitar
Geraint Watkins – keyboards
John David – bass
Kim Wilson – harmonica
Martin Belmont – electric guitar
Mickey Gee – guitar
Bobby Irwin – drums, background vocals
Keith Morris – photography
Pete Thomas – drums
Jimmie Vaughan – electric guitar
Terry Williams – drums
Paul Bassman – bass

References

External links
 

1988 albums
Nick Lowe albums
Albums produced by Nick Lowe
Columbia Records albums